Georg Ay (9 June 1900 in Quedlinburg, Province of Saxony – 1 February 1997 in Linz am Rhein) was a German politician, member of the Nazi Party.

Ay first joined the Nazi Party in December 1929 and in 1931 he was appointed Kreisleiter of party circles in Quedlinburg-Ballenstedt. He was a  Nazi member of the Reichstag from 1933 until the collapse of the Third Reich in 1945.

References

1900 births
1997 deaths
People from Quedlinburg
People from the Province of Saxony
German Protestants
Nazi Party politicians
Members of the Reichstag of Nazi Germany
Kreisleiter